Solute carrier family 2, facilitated glucose transporter member 9 is a protein that in humans is encoded by the SLC2A9 gene.

This gene encodes a member of the SLC2A facilitative glucose transporter family. Members of this family play a significant role in maintaining glucose homeostasis.  The encoded protein may play a role in the development and survival of chondrocytes in cartilage matrices. Two transcript variants encoding distinct isoforms have been identified for this gene.

SLC2A9 has also recently been found to transport uric acid, and genetic variants of the transporter have been linked to increased risk of development of both hyperuricemia, gout and Alzheimer's disease.

See also
 Glucose transporter
 Solute carrier family

References

Further reading

Solute carrier family